5: Five Years of Hyperdub is a compilation album of material from the back catalogue of the record label Hyperdub. The first disc consists of unreleased material, and the second disc consists of previously released tracks.

Pitchfork listed 5: Five Years of Hyperdub as the 27th best album of 2009.

Track listing

Charts

References

2009 compilation albums
Hyperdub albums